Bellwood is a borough in Blair County, Pennsylvania, United States. It is part of the Altoona, PA Metropolitan Statistical Area. The population was at 1,829 as of the 2020 census.

Geography
Bellwood is located at  (40.601566, -78.333616).

Bellwood is a rural area situated in the Tuckahoe Valley, part of the Logan Valley area. Bellwood was originally called Bell's Mills. The Borough of Bellwood is surrounded by the Township of Antis.

History

Bellwood's first resident was Edward Bell who moved here with his wife, mother, and father John Bell in 1806. Edward Bell's son, Martin Bell, founded the Sabbath Rest Foundry located in Antis Township (Pinecroft) so-called because he invented a new way to stoke the fires and leave them burn Sunday without having any person attend to them.

Demographics

As of the census of 2000, there were 2,016 people, 776 households, and 555 families residing in the borough. The population density was 4,361.8 people per square mile (1,692.1/km²). There were 822 housing units at an average density of 1,778.5 per square mile (689.9/km²). The racial makeup of the borough was 98.81% White, 0.10% African American, 0.05% Native American, 0.20% Asian, 0.20% from other races, and 0.64% from two or more races. Hispanic or Latino of any race were 0.89% of the population.

There were 776 households, out of which 32.7% had children under the age of 18 living with them, 55.5% were married couples living together, 10.8% had a female householder with no husband present, and 28.4% were non-families. 24.5% of all households were made up of individuals, and 12.0% had someone living alone who was 65 years of age or older. The average household size was 2.54 and the average family size was 3.01.
In the borough the population was spread out, with 25.5% under the age of 18, 7.3% from 18 to 24, 28.6% from 25 to 44, 21.5% from 45 to 64, and 17.1% who were 65 years of age or older. The median age was 37 years. For every 100 females there were 89.8 males. For every 100 females age 18 and over, there were 84.7 males.

The median income for a household in the borough was $34,595, and the median income for a family was $40,091. Males had a median income of $28,869 versus $17,424 for females. The per capita income for the borough was $14,323. About 5.6% of families and 9.3% of the population were below the poverty line, including 13.7% of those under age 18 and 12.8% of those age 65 or over.

Community

The tight knit community has many special events that occur throughout the year. There are car shows and firemen conventions that occur each year. Each holiday usually has a parade that leads down Main Street. It has great pride in its hometown football team, The Bellwood-Antis Blue Devils; especially when they play their backyard neighbor, Tyrone.

The borough provides services such as a highway department to maintain roads and a police department which provides 24 hour coverage to the residents within the borough. As well as the Bellwood Volunteer Fire Department who takes great pride in protecting their community as well as nearby communities, this neighborhood is home to the Bland and Delgrosso families. Fred Bland founded the Delgrosso's Amusement Park in 1907. The park was sold to George Rinard in 1928. Rinard sold the park to Fred Delgrosso in 1946.

Notable person
 Jennie Margaret Gheer (missionary)

Nearby communities
Altoona, Bedford, Coalport, Duncansville, Ebensburg, Hollidaysburg, Huntingdon, Johnstown, State College, Tyrone, and Warriors Mark are nearby.

See also

 List of boroughs in Pennsylvania

References

External links

 Bellwood-Antis Community Site
 Bellwood-Antis Public Library
 Bellwood-Antis School District
 Bellwood Football (BAHS Football)
 Bellwood Sportsmen's Association

Boroughs in Blair County, Pennsylvania
1898 establishments in Pennsylvania